San Diego Gay & Lesbian News (SDGLN) is an online LGBT newspaper for the San Diego, California area.  SDGLN features daily news and commentary online with a weekly wrap-up of stories delivered to e-mail subscribers every week. SDGLN partners with other media outlets who contribute content.

It was founded in 2009 by SDGLN'''s publisher, Johnathan Hale, and is owned by his company, Hale Media, Inc.

Another LGBT newspaper in the San Diego area, the Gay and Lesbian Times'', ceased publication in 2010.

References

Newspapers published in San Diego
LGBT culture in San Diego
LGBT-related newspapers published in the United States
Publications established in 2009
2009 establishments in California